Leucovis is a genus of moths of the family Noctuidae. The genus was erected by George Hampson in 1908.

Species
 Leucovis alba Rothschild, 1897
 Leucovis lepta Fawcett, 1917

References

Agaristinae